Zelwa , is a village in the administrative district of Gmina Giby, within Sejny County, Podlaskie Voivodeship, in north-eastern Poland, close to the borders with Belarus and Lithuania.

The village has a population of 200.

References

Zelwa